Zainab Jah is a British award-winning theater, television and film actress of Sierra Leonean descent. She is mostly known for her theater performances as Maima (Wife Number Two) in Danai Gurira's Broadway play Eclipsed, Venus, and School Girls, among others.

She has also worked in film and television. She plays anti-corruption minister Aminata Sissoko in the second season of Deep State, and Aby Bah in Homeland. She has also appeared on Blindspot and Law & Order: Special Victims Unit.

Filmography

Film

Television

Theatre

Awards

References

Year of birth missing (living people)
Living people
Sierra Leonean actresses
British stage actresses
British film actresses
British television actresses